Addis Ababa Agreement may refer to:

Addis Ababa Agreement (1972), a peace agreement in the First Sudanese Civil War
Addis Ababa Agreement (1993), a peace agreement in the Somali Civil War

See also 
Treaty of Addis Ababa, signed in October 1896